Karl Albert Ludwig Aschoff (10 January 1866 – 24 June 1942) was a German physician and pathologist. He is considered to be one of the most influential pathologists of the early 20th century and is regarded as the most important German pathologist after Rudolf Virchow.

Early life and education
Aschoff was born in Berlin, Prussia on 10 January 1866. He studied medicine at the University of Bonn, University of Strasbourg, and the University of Würzburg.

Career
After his habilitation in 1894, Ludwig Aschoff was appointed professor for pathology at the University of Göttingen in 1901. Aschoff transferred to the University of Marburg in 1903 to head the department for pathological anatomy. In 1906, he accepted a position as ordinarius at the University of Freiburg, where he remained until his death.

Aschoff was interested in the pathology and pathophysiology of the heart. He discovered nodules in the myocardium present during rheumatic fever, the so-called Aschoff bodies. Aschoff's reputation attracted students from all over the world, among them Sunao Tawara. Together they discovered and described the atrioventricular node (AV node, Aschoff-Tawara node). Numerous travels abroad, to England, Canada, Japan, and the U.S. led to many research connections, whereas the trips to Japan proved to be especially productive.  Aschoff's popularity in Japanese medicine had its roots in his work with Tawara and a journey through Japan in 1924. In the early 20th century, 23 of 26 Japanese pathological institutes were headed by students of Aschoff.

Among his pathological studies was also the issue of racial differences. "Pathology of constitution" invented by him became a special branch of research of National Socialist (Nazi) doctors under the name of "military pathology". Franz Buechner is reported to be Aschoff's most prominent pupil. One of Aschoff's sons, Jürgen Aschoff, went on to become one of the founders of the field of chronobiology.

Death

Aschoff died on 24 June 1942 in Freiburg, Germany.

Personal life
His grave is preserved in the Protestant Friedhof I der Jerusalems- und Neuen Kirchengemeinde (Cemetery No. I of the congregations of Jerusalem's Church and New Church) in Berlin-Kreuzberg, south of Hallesches Tor.

See also
 Rokitansky–Aschoff sinuses
 Pathology
 List of pathologists

References

External links
 

1866 births
1942 deaths
Scientists from Berlin
People from the Province of Brandenburg
German pathologists
University of Bonn alumni
University of Strasbourg alumni
University of Würzburg alumni
Academic staff of the University of Göttingen
Academic staff of the University of Marburg
Academic staff of the University of Freiburg